Ashmore is an inner city suburb in the City of Gold Coast, Queensland, Australia.

History 
In October 1887, in the area now known as Ashmore and Benowa, 5 subdivisions comprising the Benowa Estate and Plantation on the Nerang River were advertised to be auctioned by James R. Dickson. A map advertising the auction states the Estate was located 4 miles to Southport bound by a good road on one side and bound by the navigable Nerang River on the other side. Extensive buildings and plant for sugar manufacturing were included in the estate.

In the 1970s, Jim Donellon, a property investor from Sydney, purchased and developed a housing estate called Ashmore Village. The Ashmore Plaza Shopping Centre was developed by the late 1970s.

Ashmore State School opened on 23 January 1978.

Trinity Lutheran Primary School opened in Cotlew Street on 27 January 1981.

The suburb was officially bounded and named Ashmore on N1 December 1982.

Bellevue Park State School opened on 24 January 1983 in Southport. It is now within Ashmore.

Trinity Lutheran College opened on Ashmore Road as a secondary school on 28 January 1987. In 2002 it amalgamated with the Trinity Lutheran Primary School under the name Trinity Lutheran College. The early and junior year students are at the Cotlew Street campus while the middle and senior students are at the Ashmore Road campus.

Demographics
The median age of the Ashmore population was 40 years, 3 years above the national median of 37.  65.7% of people living in Ashmore were born in Australia. The other top responses for country of birth were New Zealand 9.2%, England 4.9%, Japan 1.1%, Scotland 0.7%, Korea, Republic of 0.7%.  82.9% of people spoke only English at home; the next most common languages were 1.5% Japanese, 0.9% Korean, 0.6% German, 0.6% Greek, 0.5% Mandarin.

Natural environment

Pre-clearing, the vegetation of Ashmore included substantial areas of blackbutt (Eucalyptus pilularis) tall open forest on lowland metamorphosed sediments. This ecosystem type is now listed as endangered with extinction in Queensland having been extensively cleared for agriculture and housing development.

The area now occupied by Royal Pines resort once supported established Eucalyptus tereticornis forests and wetlands with patches of rainforest. Jabiru, magpie geese and a variety of water birds used these wetlands which stretched from Nerang to near Burleigh Heads along the floodplain of the Nerang River Valley and Mudgeereebah and Bonogin Creeks. This ecosystem was akin to Kakadu with lagoons of lilypads, swamp rainforest and gnarled old paperbark forest filled with palms. In the 1980s prior to the development of Royal Pines resort, farmland with remnant degraded wetlands and some forest remained, and jabiru, spoonbills, magpie geese and a variety of other birds could be seen there. Development in recent decades has led to the loss of most remnant natural vegetation.

Education
Ashmore State School is a government primary (Prep-6) school for boys and girls at Currumburra Road. In 2018, the school had an enrolment of 894 students with 59 teachers (52 full-time equivalent) and 32 non-teaching staff (23 full-time equivalent). It includes a special education program.

Bellevue Park State School is a government primary (Prep-6) school for boys and girls at Sapium Road. In 2018, the school had an enrolment of 636 students with 42 teachers (39 full-time equivalent) and 29 non-teaching staff (19 full-time equivalent).  It includes a special education program.

Trinity Lutheran College is a private primary and secondary (6-12) school for boys and girls with two campuses, with the Prep-5 campus at 251 Cotlew Street  and the 6-12 campus at 641 Ashmore Road. In 2018, the school had an enrolment of 1,082 students with 86 teachers (78 full-time equivalent) and 61 non-teaching staff (33 full-time equivalent).

There is no government secondary school in Ashmore. The nearest government secondary schools are Keebra Park State High School in neighbouring Southport to the east, Benowa State High School in neighbouring Benowa to the south, and Nerang State High School in neighbouring Nerang to the west.

Gold Coast Institute of TAFE also has one campus located in Ashmore. It is on the corner of Heeb Street and Benowa Road.

Amenities 
The main retail area of Ashmore is on Southport-Nerang Road, which features the Ashmore City Shopping Centre, as well as several larger stores such as Spotlight and Anaconda.  The suburb features Hungry Jack's, Pizza Hut and Red Rooster opposite Ashmore Plaza. Additionally, there are numerous factory retail outlets with well known-brands offering discounted prices, as well as a locally owned popular Florist, Flowers Gold Coast.

The Gold Coast City Council operates a fortnightly mobile library service which visits Ashmore Village Park (BMX Park) on Currumburra Road.

Ashmore Uniting Church is at 144 Cotlew Street.

Transport

Public Transport in Ashmore consists of six different bus routes, though no more than two cover most areas of the suburb. The number 741 bus from Australia Fair to Broadbeach South Station, runs through Ashmore on Cotlew Street, Freda Street and Heeb Street through other streets. It runs on weekdays and weekends and is often considered very unreliable and infrequent. The 738 is a half hourly bus service that runs between Griffith University and Broadbeach South Station and follows the number 741 bus from Heeb Street until Freda Street where it turns onto Nerang-Southport Road and continues onto Ashmore City.

Major roads in Ashmore include Cotlew Street, Ashmore Road, Currumburra Road, Heeb Street, Wardoo Street, Benowa Road and Nerang-Southport Road.

See also
 Suburbs of the Gold Coast

References

External links
 
Gold Coast City Council Heritage site: Ashmore

Suburbs of the Gold Coast, Queensland
1972 establishments in Australia
Populated places established in 1972